Senator Crowley may refer to:

Elizabeth Crowley (Rhode Island politician) (born 1951), Rhode Island State Senate
Jeremiah Crowley (politician) (1832–1901), Massachusetts State Senate
Miles Crowley (1859–1921), Texas State Senate
Richard Crowley (1836–1908), New York State Senate
Thomas Crowley (American politician) (1935–2013), Vermont State Senate